After a four year absence due to the First World War, the Grey Cup was up for grabs once again as a couple of familiar foes battled for the trophy. The Toronto Varsity Blues defeated the Toronto Argonauts. It was the final time these cross-town rivals challenged each other for the Grey Cup.

Canadian Football News in 1920
CIRFU and IRFU adopted a four-yard Interference rule while the CRU opted for three yards of Interference.

ARFU played games with 12 players per side and introduced the snap-back. The reduction in the number of players was done for monetary reasons as train rates were high after World War I. The CRU would make the same changes in 1921.

The MRFU champion Winnipeg Victorias were unable to field a full team for the WCRFU finals and withdrew from competition. The MRFU wanted to substitute the second place University of Manitoba Varsity team but the SRFU refused to accept the challenge.

As champions of the WCRFU, the Regina Rugby Club issued a challenge to compete for the Grey Cup. The CRU had already established its playoff schedule and was unwilling to make any changes. At the time, the CIRFU champions had not been determined but McGill had already announced that if they won the CIRFU they would not compete in the CRU playoffs. The CRU ruled that if McGill won the CIRFU then the Regina Rugby Club would take the place of the CIRFU in the playoffs. In the end, the University of Toronto Varsity team won the CIRFU and the west had to wait one more year before it could compete for the Grey Cup.

Regular season

Final regular season standings
Note: GP = Games Played, W = Wins, L = Losses, T = Ties, PF = Points For, PA = Points Against, Pts = Points

League champions

Grey Cup playoffs
Note: All dates in 1920

SRFU Playoff

Regina Rugby Club wins the SRFU championship

ARFU playoffs

Calgary wins the total-point series 35–33. Calgary advances to WCRFU semifinal against Regina.

CIRFU final

Varsity advances to the Grey Cup.

Eastern final

Toronto Argonauts advance to the Grey Cup.

Western semifinal

Western final

Playoff bracket

Grey Cup Championship

References

 
Canadian Football League seasons